Simithacılı is a small village in the Tarsus district of Mersin Province, Turkey. At  it is situated in the Çukurova (Cilicia of antiquity) plains. The population of the village was only 85  as of 2012. The major crop grown in the village is cotton.

References

Villages in Tarsus District